Penrose Point State Park is a  Washington state park located on Mayo Cove and Carr Inlet at the southern end of Puget Sound in Pierce County. Park activities include picnicking, boating, scuba diving, fishing, swimming, waterskiing, clam digging, crabbing, beachcombing, birdwatching, wildlife viewing, and horseshoes. The park was named after Stephen Penrose, the president of Whitman College in Walla Walla from 1884 to 1934.

References

External links
Penrose Point State Park Washington State Parks and Recreation Commission 
Penrose Point State Park Map Washington State Parks and Recreation Commission

Parks in Pierce County, Washington
State parks of Washington (state)